Okka Magaadu is a 2008 Telugu-language vigilante action political drama film written, produced and directed by YVS Chowdary. The film stars Nandamuri Balakrishna, Simran and Anushka Shetty, with music composed by Mani Sharma.

Plot

Veera Venkata Satyanarayana Swamy is beloved by villagers whose lives were forever changed by his presence. His grandmother, Baby, whose husband had dedicated his life to gaining independence for his country, was taken as a prisoner of war and declared missing in action. Meanwhile, corrupt doctors, lawyers, and journalists are allegedly killed, but their bodies were never found. Swamy one day protects and conducts the marriage of young couples who were in love with each other but the boy's father chief minister doesn't allow him. The CM gets warned by Swamy not to destroy his son's wish to live with the lover girl. Enraged CM hires goons from Kerala to kill his son and his lover. Meanwhile, CBI finds Swamy in the judge's office and suspects the kidnap of this judge by Swamy as they check CCTV footage showing Swamy's walk-in. At night heavy fight between the goons with Okka Magudu, and the CBI arrested Swamy same time. During the time of interrogation in the CBI office, an old man named Raghupati Raghava Rajaram alias Okka Magadu comes forward and claims to have committed the alleged murders. Okka Magadu fights all the CBI to escape from there. The same night chief minister's Swiss account money get looted by Okka Magadu that transferred to the international welfare society by Okka Magadu. Right now, the enraged CM visits the CBI officers who now in hospital and insults them. Thereby, CBI tracks and finds some relation with Swamy village and thus enters Swamy House and calls Okka Magadu a traitor when Baby reveals the past. During the pre-independence era, Okka Magadu was a doctor who turned into an extreme fighter against the British people when he finds his siblings are mercilessly killed by officer Douglas. Okka Magadu decapitates Douglas when he tries to humiliate the Baby alias Sharada. Thereafter, he nuptials her. Now British people get immense loss due to Okka Magadu, so, they decide to give freedom to India with a cabal that to hand over all the extremists that including Okka Magadu where they deceive by exploding the ship in the middle of the sea from which but Okka Magadu escaped. At present, CBI officers respect Okka Magadu and announce their followers. At last, the CM tries to get meeting in front of judge to show oka magadu as the killer but oka magadu brings all the bad people who were missing thus the cm gets again exposed of bad activities when a final video show cm with the opposition leader proposes 5lak rupes for somebody who died to protest against case removal that charged against okamagadu but was a planned killing..now cm brings his goons to fight with okamagadu and a terrific fight happens.  Finally scene show flight with cm and an opposition leader with bad goons behind travels abroad but okamagadu who already driven away the pilot tells the flight will hit mountain and they all die.. ending scene show reporter ask sharada if she believes oka magadu will come back and sharada tells he told he will come back.. now okamagadu is seen walking between the mountains by the side of the exploded plane.

Cast

Soundtrack

Music composed by Mani Sharma. Lyrics were written by Chandrabose. The music was released on 21 December 2007.

References

External links

2008 films
Films scored by Mani Sharma
Films directed by Y. V. S. Chowdary
2000s Telugu-language films